Bethan Sayed (née Jenkins, born 9 December 1981) is a Welsh politician. She represented the South Wales West Region for Plaid Cymru as a Member of the Senedd from 2007 to 2021.

Early life and education
Sayed was born in Aberdare, the daughter of poet Mike Jenkins. She grew up in Merthyr Tydfil, where both her parents were involved in the Anti-Apartheid Movement of the 1980s and early 1990s. Her brother is the Channel 4 News reporter Ciaran Jenkins.

She was educated at Ysgol Gyfun Rhydfelen, near Pontypridd. She graduated with a BScEcon degree in International Politics and International History at the University of Wales, Aberystwyth in 2005.
Through student politics, she was elected to the Aberystwyth Guild of Students executive, and was serving as Guild President by 2004. With the organisation Cymru X she has served as a national organiser of the party's youth wing.

Senedd

In 2006, Jenkins was selected as Plaid Cymru's lead candidate for the South West Wales Regional list and was duly elected in the subsequent elections of May 2007. Jenkins was initially Plaid Cymru's Child Poverty and Culture Spokesperson for the Plaid Cymru group at the National Assembly, and sat on the Communities and Culture committee, Audit committee, and the Petitions Committee.

In 2012, Jenkins was appointed Plaid's spokesperson for Heritage, Welsh language and Sport. She is chairperson for the Assembly's Cross Party Eating Disorder Group, and formed a new cross party group on human rights. Jenkins has been an outspoken republican. Alongside her Plaid Cymru colleague, Leanne Wood, she is a member of the group Republic. In 2022, she opposed the accession of Charles III as King of the United Kingdom and Prince William taking the title "Prince of Wales" (see Opposition to the Prince of Wales title).

In 2018, she married Rahil Sayed and announced she would be changing her surname to Sayed for both personal and professional purposes.

In August 2020, Sayed announced she would not be standing in the 2021 Senedd election.

Controversies
During her first year as a Senedd Member she claimed over £10,000 in expenses including spending £750 per month on a second home in Cardiff after claiming it would not be possible for her to do her job without the second home. AMs representing South Wales were later barred from claiming a second home allowance, but were permitted to claim up to 20 nights in Cardiff hotels provided they were working the next morning. In 2013 Jenkins was later criticised for claiming a nights stay in a Cardiff hotel after attending a Rihanna concert. Jenkins later repaid the money claimed.

In June 2012, Jenkins called Northern Ireland's Deputy First Minister Martin McGuinness "naive" in light of him meeting Queen of the United Kingdom Elizabeth II at a charity reception. After Welsh Labour members highlighted the comments, Jenkins said that she was appalled at being accused of "trying to destabilise" the peace process, and that she was giving up Twitter for the time being.

Early in the hours of Sunday 14 October 2012, Jenkins was arrested by South Wales Police in Llandaff, Cardiff for driving erratically. When tested for alcohol, she was more than twice the legal limit. She was released on bail by police pending further enquiries. Jenkins issued a statement, stating that there were "no excuses" for what she had done, and that she had resigned her position as Plaid's spokeswoman on heritage, the Welsh language and sport. Her statement also stated that she had been receiving professional medical help for depression. On Monday 15 October, Jenkins was suspended from the Plaid group of AMs "while the process of justice takes its course". On 12 November 2012, Jenkins was charged with drink driving, and on 19 December was banned from driving for 20 months.

References

Office held

1981 births
Living people
Plaid Cymru politicians
Plaid Cymru members of the Senedd
Wales AMs 2007–2011
Wales AMs 2011–2016
Wales MSs 2016–2021
Female members of the Senedd
Alumni of Aberystwyth University
Welsh bloggers
Welsh republicans
People from Aberdare
People from Merthyr Tydfil
People educated at Ysgol Gyfun Garth Olwg
British women bloggers
Welsh women bloggers
Welsh-speaking politicians